Fear of wasps (or of wasp stings), technically known as spheksophobia (from , , "wasp" + , , "fear"), is one of the common fears among people and is a kind of specific phobia. It is similar to fear of bees (which is often called apiphobia or melissophobia). Both are types of entomophobia, which is itself a category of zoophobia.

Also see
Gianluigi_Buffon#Personal_life  professional footballer with spheksophobia
Friard d'Indret  patron saint against fear of wasps (spheksophobia)
 The Crush (1993 film)  lead character has spheksophobia; shows wasp attack
Wiktionary: spheksophobia
Wikidata: spheksophobia

External links

References

Zoophobias
Wasps